Viola brittoniana, known as coast violet, northern coastal violet and Britton's violet, is a rare, acaulescent blue-flowered violet that is endemic to the eastern United States. It has distinctive leaves with narrow lobes and deep sinuses. It is a perennial.

Conservation status
It is listed as endangered in Connecticut and Pennsylvania. It is listed as threatened in Massachusetts and as possibly extirpated in Maine.

References

brittoniana
Flora of the Northeastern United States
Flora without expected TNC conservation status